Lulizumab pegol (INN; development code BMS-931699) is a monoclonal antibody designed for the treatment of autoimmune diseases.

This drug was developed by Bristol-Myers Squibb.

References 

Monoclonal antibodies
Bristol Myers Squibb